Sleep Dank, also known as Sleep Da Danker or Sleepdank, is an American rapper signed to the late Mac Dre's label Thizz Entertainment.

Early life
Sleep Dank and fellow Thizz rapper Dubee were best friends from their childhood when they played baseball while growing up in Vallejo, California. He started a group called 535 with Dank, Dubee and Mac Mall as the members. He would later go on to be featured on albums such as Mac Dre's Stupid Doo Doo Dumb and release a group album with Montana Montana Montana named Maclafornia 2016.

Discography

Studio albums
 Murder Book Author (2001)
 Bookilation: Murder Book Author Part II (2002)
 15bluntz2light' (2003)
 Hot SHHT (2006)
 Vallejo's Top Exec (2006)
 Danker Nation (2006)
 Crest - Home Of The Thizz Dance (2007)
 I Love Rap Money (2010)
 Still King of My City (2012)
 "Maclafornia" (2016)

Compilations
 Greatest Hits: Murderbook Author, Pt. 2'' (2009)

References

External links
Sleep Dank Twitter
Sleep Dank MySpace

American rappers
West Coast hip hop musicians
Rappers from the San Francisco Bay Area
Musicians from Vallejo, California
Living people
Gangsta rappers
21st-century American rappers
Year of birth missing (living people)